Sadullah Khan, originally from South Africa, was a student leader active in the anti-apartheid struggle.  Sheikh Khan has been a public speaker since the age of 12, a public reciter of Quran since age 6, a chanter of melodious odes in praise of the Prophet since 8, and an experienced teacher at colleges and universities in South Africa and the United States; Khan completed studies in law at University of Durban, South Africa, Journalism (UK) and Islamic Studies at Al - Azhar University in Cairo, Egypt.

Khan co-founded the Islamic College of Southern Africa (now International Peace University of South Africa) where he also headed the Quranic Sciences Department from 1990 to 1998.  He formerly wrote the column  Ask the Imam for Beliefnet.com, and lectured on Islamic Civilization at California State University, Dominguez Hills, where he also presented a thirteen-week three-hour weekly live TV program from CSUDH on Islamic Civilization & Culture. As a motivational speaker he addresses issues of theology, spirituality, empowerment and youth development. He is the author of the book Dimensions of the Qur'an. 
Sadullah Khan has served in several roles:

 Director of Muslim Affairs at the University of Southern California
 Lecturer on Islam for the Academy of Judaic, Christian and Islamic Studies at the University of California, Los Angeles
 Advisor for the development of the post-graduate Islamic Studies program at Claremont Graduate University
 Advisor to the Chancellor's Committee on Religion Ethics and Values at UCLA
 Presenter of weekly Wise Living TV show titled  "From the Streets of LA to the Hearts of the World"

He currently serves as the CEO of Islamia College, in Cape Town, South Africa.

References

Religion academics
University of California, Los Angeles faculty
University of Southern California faculty
University of KwaZulu-Natal alumni
Al-Azhar University alumni
Year of birth missing (living people)
Living people